University High School is a public alternative high school in Roswell, New Mexico.

See also 
List of high schools in New Mexico
Roswell Independent School District
Goddard High School
Roswell High School

References

External links 
 Official School Webpage

Roswell, New Mexico
Schools in Chaves County, New Mexico
Public high schools in New Mexico
Alternative schools in the United States